Pier 23 is a 1951 American film noir movie. It was directed by William Berke for Lippert Pictures.

It was intended for television as well as the cinema.

Plot

Cast

See also
Danger Zone (1951)
Roaring City (1951)

References

External links

Pier 23 at TCMDB
Pier 23 at BFI

1951 films
1950s English-language films
American crime films
1951 crime films
Lippert Pictures films
Films directed by William A. Berke
American black-and-white films
1950s American films